Victoria Lodge railway station served the village of Tweedsmuir, Scottish Borders, Scotland from 1897 to 1905 on the Symington, Biggar and Broughton Railway and the Talla Railway.

History 
The station opened in 1897 by the North British Railway. To the west was Talla Water which was served by various sidings. In its last year of life on 28 September, two special trains ran to the station. It closed later in the same year.

References

External links 

Disused railway stations in the Scottish Borders
Railway stations in Great Britain opened in 1897
Railway stations in Great Britain closed in 1905
Former North British Railway stations
1897 establishments in Scotland
1905 disestablishments in Scotland